Satish Vyas) is a former Indian actor in Hindi and Gujarati language films.

Career
He was best known as a child actor after his brilliant performance in V Shantaram’s Toofan Aur Deeya (1956) where the veteran actress Nanda made her debut as a leading lady. This was followed by Hum Panchhi Ek Daal Ke (1957) which won the Prime Minister's Gold Medal for the Best Children's Film.

He was seen as a lead actor in the 1968 Gujarati film Maadi Mane Kahewa De.

Filmography

References

External links
 

Male actors in Hindi cinema
Place of birth missing
20th-century Indian male actors